Digital Dreams Music Festival is a two-day electronic music festival held in Toronto, Ontario, Canada, at RBC Echo Beach at Ontario Place. The festival has four stages and has around 25,000 attenders over two days.

History 
The festival began in 2012 on June 30 – July 1. It is held annually in July, about the time of the Canada Day long weekend. It was the first outdoor electronic music festival in downtown Toronto and had much success. In 2012, the festival began with four stages: the Digital Stage, the Dream Stage, the Bass Stage and the Canada Stage. The 2013 festival followed this same set-up.

The festival operates with the support of corporate sponsorship.

2012 festival line-up 
The 2012 festival line-up featured Duck Sauce, Richie Hawtin, Chuckie, R3hab, Steve Lawler, A-Trak, Guy Gerber, Autoerotique, Kaskade, Alesso, Dubfire, Nic Fanciulli, Mark Knight, Boris, Carlo Lio, Designer Drugs and Sydney Blu.  The festival was held at the Flats at The Molson Canadian Amphitheatre.

2013 festival line-up 
The 2013 festival headliner was the DJ, Tiësto. The Canadian electronic music pioneer, Richie Hawtin also returned in 2013 to headline the second main stage at Echo Beach. Other performers were Junkies, LUSH, Marcus Visionary, Mord Fustan, Damn Kids and Flosstradamus.

2014 festival
In 2014, the festival was held at Ontario Place.  The audience at the festival was estimated at 29,000, and the event was marred by some drug- and alcohol-related injuries. This was one of several festivals held that summer on government property which resulted in serious injuries, causing local politicians to call for a ban on the use of public land for festivals and raves. The festival received good reviews for its music, but poor reviews for festival organization.

Musicians performing at the festival included Tiesto, Jay Lumen, Fedde Le Grand, Luciano, Art Department, Eric Prydz, Justice, Claude Von Stroke, Deep Dish, Nicole Moudaber, Paul Oakenfold, Dash Berlin, Nervo, Andy C, Victor Calderone, Danny Tenaglia, Dimitri Vegas & Like Mike, Carnage, the Chainsmokers, Guy Gerber, Sharam, TJR, Makj and DJ Sneak,

2015
Because of heavy rain, the first day of the 2015 festival was cancelled. The flyer was changed from a "Rain or Shine Event" to "Rain or Shine, Except Rain".

References

External links
Digital Dreams Music Festival
99.9 Virgin Radio Toronto :: Digital Dreams Music Festival, Saturday, June 29 @ 6:00 PM :: Concert Details

Music festivals in Toronto